Delta Sagittarii (δ Sagittarii, abbreviated Delta Sgr, δ Sgr), formally named Kaus Media , is a double star in the southern zodiac constellation of Sagittarius. The apparent visual magnitude of this star is +2.70, making it easily visible to the naked eye.

Properties

Eggleton and Tokovinin (2008) list Delta Sagittarii as a binary star system consisting of an evolved K-type giant star with a stellar classification of K3 III, and a white dwarf companion. The giant is a weak barium star, most likely having had its surface abundance of s-process elements enhanced through mass transfer from its orbiting companion. It has an estimated 3.21 times the mass of the Sun and is about 260million years old.

Delta Sagittarii has three dim visual companions:
 a 14th magnitude star at a separation of 26 arcseconds,
 a 15th magnitude star at a separation of 40 arcseconds, and
 a 13th magnitude star at a separation of 58 arcseconds from the primary.

Nomenclature

δ Sagittarii (Latinised to Delta Sagittarii) is the star's Bayer designation.

In 2016, the International Astronomical Union organized a Working Group on Star Names (WGSN) to catalog and standardize proper names for stars. The WGSN's first bulletin of July 2016 included a table of the first two batches of names approved by the WGSN; which included Kaus Media for this star.

In the catalogue of stars in the Calendarium of Al Achsasi al Mouakket, this star was designated , meaning 'second of Warida'.

In Chinese astronomy,   ('Winnowing Basket') refers to an asterism consisting of Delta Sagittarii, Gamma2 Sagittarii, Epsilon Sagittarii and Eta Sagittarii.

This star, together with Gamma Sagittarii, Epsilon Sagittarii, Zeta Sagittarii, Lambda Sagittarii, Sigma Sagittarii, Tau Sagittarii and Phi Sagittarii, comprises the Teapot asterism.
 
In Hindu astrology, this star is also called .

References

External links
Kaus Media information on Stars site

K-type giants
Barium stars
White dwarfs
Binary stars
Sagittarii, Delta
Sagittarius (constellation)
Kaus Media
Sagittarii, 19
089931
6859
168454
Durchmusterung objects